Perriam Down near Ludgershall, Wiltshire, England was used as a venue for five first-class cricket and at least three other matches between 1787 and 1796. It was a favoured venue of Thomas Assheton Smith I who patronised cricket in the area and organised all the matches.

References

1787 establishments in England
Cricket grounds in Wiltshire
Cricket in Wiltshire
Defunct cricket grounds in England
Defunct sports venues in Wiltshire
English cricket venues in the 18th century
History of Wiltshire
Sport in Wiltshire
Sports venues completed in 1787
Sports venues in Wiltshire
Ludgershall, Wiltshire